Arkansas Northeastern College is a public community college in Blytheville, Arkansas.

History
Originally called Mississippi County Community College, Dr. Harry V. Smith was selected as its first president, serving from February 1975 to October 1, 1983. Dr. John P. Sullins succeeded him.
In 2003, the college opened up a child care center. It works to provide free daycare for up to 54 of the children of students.
In 2015, the college started a 13 million dollar project to combine three of the school's centers: Harry L. Crisp Center, the Burdette Center and the Aircraft & Metals Engineering Center.

Campuses
The college's main campus is in Blytheville, Arkansas. It has additional locations in Leachville and Osceola.

Academics
The college offers technical certificates, associate of science degrees, associate in applied science degrees, and certificates of proficiency. In fall 2013 there were 1,425 students; 619 were full-time and 806 were part-time.

References

External links
Official website

Education in Mississippi County, Arkansas
Educational institutions established in 1975
Community colleges in Arkansas
Two-year colleges in the United States
1975 establishments in Arkansas
Blytheville, Arkansas